

Brithwine I was a medieval Bishop of Sherborne.

Brithwine was consecrated between 1014 and 1017. He died between 1014 and 1017.

Notes

Citations

References

External links
 

Bishops of Sherborne (ancient)
1010s deaths
11th-century English Roman Catholic bishops
Year of birth unknown